The Victoria Park (Associated) Presbyterian Church is a Presbyterian church in northeast Toronto, Ontario, Canada. It is currently a member of the Associated Presbyterian Churches, a small, mainly Scottish denomination that emphasizes strict adherence to the Westminster Confession of Faith and the regulative principle of worship.

Beginning in 1910 the church was known as the Bloor East Presbyterian Church, because of its location on Toronto's vital thoroughfare, Bloor Street.

In 1965 it joined another traditional Presbyterian congregation in Chesley, Ontario in forming the Presbyterian Reformed Church, which would later expand to include churches in the United States and England as well. Much of the credit for this union fell to John Murray, the well-known professor at Westminster Theological Seminary in Philadelphia. He composed the proposals leading to the union, and also the constitution which served as the basis of union. In 1969 the congregation left their premises in the business district, and relocated to the current location on Victoria Park Avenue, north of Sheppard Avenue.

In 1974, however, the church was again without a pastor, and decided to join the Free Presbyterian Church of Scotland, in part so it could be connected to a larger body with a more ample supply of seminary-trained ministerial candidates. In 1989, there was a split in the denomination over the interpretation of parts of the Westminster Confession concerning liberty of conscience and the extent to which Free Presbyterians should fellowship with evangelicals in other denominations. The congregation determined to join the newly formed Associated Presbyterian Churches, and has remained part of it to the present day.

Among the congregation's particular distinctives compared to most nearby Presbyterian churches are its strict subscription to the original Westminster Confession of Faith, its practice of the regulative principle of worship (including exclusive psalmody and no musical instruments in worship), an emphasis on faithful observance of the weekly Sabbath but opposition to traditional holy days, belief in the superiority of the Received Text underlying the King James Bible, and promotion of the establishment principle concerning the relationship between the church and state.

External links
Denominational site

1910 establishments in Ontario
Presbyterian churches in Toronto
20th-century Presbyterian church buildings in Canada